Freivalds' algorithm (named after Rūsiņš Mārtiņš Freivalds) is a probabilistic randomized algorithm used to verify matrix multiplication. A naïve algorithm would compute the product  explicitly and compare term by term whether this product equals . However, the best known matrix multiplication algorithm runs in  time. Freivalds' algorithm utilizes randomization in order to reduce this time bound to 
with high probability.

The algorithm

Input

Output
Yes, if ; No, otherwise.

Procedure
 Generate an n × 1 random 0/1 vector .
 Compute .
 Output "Yes" if ; "No," otherwise.

Error
If , then the algorithm always returns "Yes". If , then the probability that the algorithm returns "Yes" is less than or equal to one half. This is called one-sided error.

Example
Suppose one wished to determine whether:

A random two-element vector with entries equal to 0 or 1 is selected say  and used to compute:

This yields the zero vector, suggesting the possibility that AB = C. However, if in a second trial the vector  is selected, the result becomes:

The result is nonzero, proving that in fact AB ≠ C.

There are four two-element 0/1 vectors, and half of them give the zero vector in this case ( and ), so the chance of randomly selecting these in two trials (and falsely concluding that AB=C) is 1/22 or 1/4. In the general case, the proportion of r yielding the zero vector may be less than 1/2, and a larger number of trials (such as 20) would be used, rendering the probability of error very small.

Error analysis
Let p equal the probability of error. We claim that if A × B = C, then p = 0, and if A × B ≠ C, then p ≤ 1/2.

Case A × B = C

Hence the probability for error in this case is:

Case A × B ≠ C
Let  such that

Where

.

Suppose that the element . By the definition of matrix multiplication, we have:

.

For some constant .
Using Bayes' theorem, we can partition over :

We use that:

Plugging these in the equation, we get:

Therefore, 

This completes the proof.

Ramifications
The error analysis also shows that if the algorithm is run  times, an error bound of less than  can be achieved, an exponentially small quantity. The algorithm is also fast in practice due to wide availability of fast implementations for matrix-vector products. Therefore, utilization of randomized algorithms can speed up a very slow deterministic algorithm.

Freivalds' algorithm frequently arises in introductions to probabilistic algorithms because of its simplicity and how it illustrates the superiority of probabilistic algorithms in practice for some problems.

See also
 Schwartz–Zippel lemma

References

 Freivalds, R. (1977), “Probabilistic Machines Can Use Less Running Time”, IFIP Congress 1977, pp. 839–842.

Articles containing proofs
Matrix theory
Randomized algorithms
Matrix multiplication algorithms